Lindström or Lindstrøm is a Swedish surname. With people of Swedish origin in English-speaking countries, the spelling used is normally Lindstrom. Notable people with the surname include:

Adolf Lindstrøm, Norwegian chef and polar explorer
Alec Lindstrom (born 1998), American football player
Anders Lindström, Swedish guitarist and pianist
Anders Lindström, Swedish Army officer
Bengt Lindström Swedish painter
Bjarne Lindstrøm, Norwegian diplomat
Chris Lindstrom, American football player
Claës Lindsström, Swedish vice admiral
Curt Lindström, Swedish ice hockey coach
Daniel Lindström, Swedish pop singer
Daniel Lindstrom (album)
Freddie Lindstrom, American baseball player
Frederick B. Lindstrom, American sociologist
Fredrik Lindström (writer), Swedish linguist, comedian, film director and presenter
Gunnar Lindström, Swedish athlete
Gustaf Lindström (1829–1901), Swedish paleontologist
Gustav Lindström (born 1998), Swedish ice hockey player
Hans-Peter Lindstrøm, Norwegian electronic musician, commonly referred to mononymously as Lindstrøm
Jesper Lindstrøm (born 2000), Danish footballer
Joakim Lindström (born 1983), Swedish ice hockey player
Linde Lindström (Mikko Viljami Lindström, born 1976), Finnish lead guitarist of the band HIM
Lise Lindstrom, American operatic soprano
Liam Lindström, Canadian ice hockey player
Marika Lindström, Swedish actress 
Martin Lindstrom, Danish branding expert and author
Matt Lindstrom, American baseball player
Mattias Lindström (footballer) (born 1980), Swedish professional football (soccer) player
Mattias Lindström (ice hockey) (born 1991), Swedish ice hockey player 
Mikael Lindström, Swedish diplomat
Maurits Lindström (1932–2009), Swedish geologist and paleontologist, specialist of prehistoric fish
Morgan Lindstrøm, Norwegian musician and composer
Naomi Lindstrom, American literary critic
Pär Lindström, Swedish freestyle swimmer
Per Lindström, Swedish logician
Pia Lindström, American television anchor
Rune Lindstrøm, Norwegian musician
 Shane Lindstrom, American record producer known professionally as Murda Beatz
Tuija Lindström, Finnish-Swedish photographer
Ulla Lindström, Swedish politician
Veli-Matti Lindström, Finnish ski jumper 
Willy Lindström, Swedish former ice hockey player

Fictional characters
Bess Lindstrom, fictional character on The Mary Tyler Moore Show
 Helen Lindstrom, fictional character in the  Venturer Twelve Science Fiction series
 Lars Lindstrom, main character in the film Lars and the Real Girl
Natalie Lindstrom, fictional character in Stephen Woodworth novels
Phyllis Lindstrom, fictional character on The Mary Tyler Moore Show and Phyllis

Swedish-language surnames